Emmelie Prophète (born June 5, 1971), also known as Emmelie Prophète Milcé, is a Haitian writer and diplomat. As of November 2022, she is serving as justice minister of Haiti.

Early life and education 
Prophète was born in Port-au-Prince and studied law and modern literature at the Université de Port-au-Prince and communications at Jackson State University.  Prophète has also hosted a jazz program on Radio-Haïti. She has served as director of the Haiti Direction Nationale du Livre and the Bureau haïtien du droit d’auteur.

Literary career 
Prophète has published two books of poetry and six novels. She has contributed to various periodicals such as Chemins Critiques, Boutures, Cultura, La Nouvelle Revue Française and Le Nouvelliste.

Her novel Le Testament des solitudes won the Grand Prix littéraire de l’Association des écrivains de langue française in 2009. It became the first novel of hers to be published in English when, translated by Tina Kover and with the English title Blue, it was published by Amazon Publishing's translation imprint, AmazonCrossing, in January 2022. 

Her 2020 novel, Les Villages de Dieu (English: The Villages of God) won the 2022 Carbet de Lycéens.

Government career 
Prophète served as an attaché at the embassy in Haiti and in Geneva. In 2014, she was named head of the National Library of Haiti. In January 2022, the acting prime minister of Haiti, Ariel Henry, appointed her Minister of Culture and Communication. Henry then named Prophète as justice minister in November 2022, making her Haiti's fifth justice minister since the July 2021 assassination of Jovenel Moïse.

Selected works 
 Des marges à remplir, poetry (2000)
 Sur parure d’ombre, poetry (2004)
 Le Testament des solitudes, novel (2007), received the Prix littéraire des Caraïbes from the 
 Published as Blue in English in 2022
 Le reste du temps, novel (2010)
 Impasse Dignité, novel (2012)
 Le désir est un visiteur silencieux, novel (2014)
 Le bout du monde est une fenêtre, novel (2015)
 Les Villages de Dieu, novel (2020)

References 

1971 births
Living people
Haitian women poets
Haitian journalists
Jackson State University alumni
People from Port-au-Prince
Haitian women novelists
21st-century Haitian novelists
21st-century Haitian poets
21st-century Haitian women writers

Female justice ministers
Justice ministers of Haiti